Microbacterium aquimaris is a Gram-positive, non-spore-forming and non-motile bacterium from the genus Microbacterium which has been isolated from seawater from Jeju in Korea. the major menaquinones of Microbacterium aquimaris are MK-11, MK-12 and MK-10.

References

Further reading

External links
Type strain of Microbacterium aquimaris at BacDive -  the Bacterial Diversity Metadatabase	

Bacteria described in 2008
aquimaris